Paweł Florek (born 24 June 1996) is a Polish footballer who plays as a goalkeeper for Alzira.

Career

As a youth player, Florek trialed for the youth academies of Borussia Dortmund, one of Germany's most successful clubs, and Sevilla in the Spanish La Liga.

In 2014, he signed with Polish third division side Nadwiślan Góra.

In 2015, Florek joined GKS Tychy in the Polish second division, where he received interest from a Dutch team and made 66 league appearances and scored 0 goals.

Before the second half of the 2017–18 season, he moved to Badajoz in the Spanish third division.

In 2019, Florek signed with Spanish fourth division outfit Alzira.

He is a rapper.

References

External links
 
 

1996 births
Living people
People from Tychy
Polish footballers
Polish expatriate footballers
Expatriate footballers in Spain
Polish expatriate sportspeople in Spain
Association football goalkeepers
I liga players
II liga players
Segunda División B players
GKS Tychy players
CD Badajoz players
CF Villanovense players
UD Alzira footballers
Tercera División players